= Autovía A-339 =

Highway in Spain

The Autovía A-339 is a highway in Spain. It passes through Andalusia.
